The , referred to from hereon as "Kōhaku", aired December 31, 2012 from NHK Hall in Japan beginning from 7:15 p.m. JST.

Broadcast 
On December 18, 2012, NHK announced it will broadcast Kōhaku live using ultra-high-definition television technology from two locations: Tokyo Tower and at NHK's Yokohama station. NHK first used UHDTV for a Kōhaku during its 57th event in 2006.

Performance Order 
Debuting or returning artists are in bold.

Songs Performed on medleys

Personnel

Main host and team leaders 
 Red Team Captain: Maki Horikita
 White Team Captain: Arashi)
 Mediator: Yumiko Udō

Live Comments 
Announcer NHK Radio 1: Minori Aoi, Naoko Hashimoto
Kōhaku Ura Talk: Terry Ito, Kouji Komatsu
Overseas Relay: Yuka Kubota (Portland, Oregon)

Judges
 Haruka Ayase (actress), played Niijima Yae in Taiga Yae no Sakura
 Naoki Ogi (Hosei University professor)
 Homare Sawa (football player), won FIFA World Player of the Year
 Nakamura Kankurō VI (Kabuki actor), received the 6th generation Nakamura Kankurō name
 Kirin Kiki (actress), won the Special Grand Prix of the jury at Montreal World Film Festival
 Katsura Bunshi VI (Rakugoka), received the 6th generation Katsura Bunshi name
 Saori Yoshida (freestyle wrestler), gold medal at the 2012 Summer Olympics, was awarded the People's Honour Award
 Ryosuke Irie (swimmer), silver and bronze medal at the 2012 Summer Olympics
 Yoko Kanno (composer), composed the Tōhoku Earthquake Recovery Support Song, "Hana wa Saku"
 Harumafuji Kōhei (sumo wrestler), won the Honbasho and was promoted to Yokozuna

Special Guests 
 Nobuyuki Tsujii
 Pink Martini
 Kyoji Yamamoto
 Masaaki Hirao

Korean performances non-existent 
The 63rd event is faced with controversy over the non-existence of acts from South Korea In one source, it is suspected that government-funded NHK avoided inviting Korean acts because of the territorial disputes over Liancourt Rocks between the South Korean and Japanese governments. Sports Chosun reported on a statement made by an NHK representative. "The fact that President Lee Myung Bak has demanded an apology is a great factor. After this incident occurred, there have been more and more hallyu stars who have stated that 'Dokdo is ours.' Considering this, viewers might have ill feelings about the K-pop stars appearing," said the NHK representative.

References 

NHK Kōhaku Uta Gassen events
2012 in Japanese music
2012 in Japanese television